PUV may refer to:

Posterior urethral valve (PUV)
Pulau virus (PuV)
Public utility vehicle (PUV) for public transportation in the Philippines
Publivoo (ICAO airline code PUV), see List of airline codes (P)
Malabou Airport (IATA airport code PUV), Poum, Malabou, New Caledonia; see List of airports in New Caledonia

See also

 PVU (disambiguation)
 puu (disambiguation)
 PVV (disambiguation)
 PW (disambiguation)